Stadio Plebiscito is a multi-use stadium in Padua, Italy. The stadium holds 9,600 all-covered seats. It is the home stadium for Italy national rugby league team.

It is used mostly for rugby union matches as the home of Petrarca Padova; but for 2010/11 season it will be used also for the home matches of the second football team of the city, San Paolo Padova, playing in Serie D.

See also

List of rugby league stadiums by capacity
List of rugby union stadiums by capacity

References

External links
Info on Padovanet.it
Petrarca Rugby
San Paolo Padova

Football venues in Italy
Rugby league stadiums in Italy
Rugby union stadiums in Italy
Buildings and structures in Padua
Sport in Padua
Sports venues in Veneto